Mati is a male given name.

People named Mati include:
Mati Ahven (born 1943), Estonian politician
Mati Alaver (born 1954), Estonian skier and coach
Mati Erelt (born 1941), Estonian linguist
Mati Ilisson (born 1960), Estonian politician
Mati Karmin (born 1959), Estonian sculptor
Mati Kepp (born 1947), Estonian politician
Mati Klarwein (1932–2002), German painter
Mati Klooren (1938–2000), Estonian actor 
Mati Kuulberg (1947–2001), Estonian composer and violinist
Mati Laur (born 1955), Estonian historian
Mati Lember (born 1985), Estonian football player
Mati Mark (1941–2008), Estonian sport shooter
Mati Meos (born 1946), Estonian engineer and politician 
Mati Nuude (1941–2001), Estonian singer and weightlifter
Mati Pari (born 1974), Estonian football player
Mati Raidma (born 1965), Estonian politician
Mati Shemoelof (born 1972), Israeli poet, editor, journalist and activist
Mati Sirkel (born 1949), Estonian translator and writer
Mati Talvik (1942–2018), Estonian television journalist
Mati Unt (1944–2005), Estonian writer, essayist and theatre director
Mati Vaarmann (born 1951), Estonian diplomat
Mati Vaikjärv (born 1944), Estonian archer
Matías Fernández (born 1986; also known as Mati Fernández), Chilean football player

References

Estonian masculine given names
Masculine given names